When a Man Falls in Love is a 2013 South Korean television series, starring Song Seung-heon, Shin Se-kyung, Chae Jung-an, and Yeon Woo-jin. The story revolves around a world-weary gangster as his love life intertwines with three others, and how the course of their lives changes entirely based on one moment of fevered passion. It aired on MBC from April 3 to June 6, 2013 on Wednesdays and Thursdays at 21:55 for 20 episodes.

Plot
Han Tae-sang (Song Seung-heon) is a successful but cold-blooded businessman who is unstoppable once he sets his mind on doing or getting something. He had once been a smart young man full of potential, but his dreams came to a halt when he was forced to work as a gangster for the same loan shark that destroyed his family. Since then, he has been able to build a successful business through his own blood, sweat and tears, and everything he's gotten in his life has been hard-earned. Then one day, what was supposed to have been a simple extortion job turns into a chance meeting with Seo Mi-do (Shin Se-kyung), the daughter of a modest bookstore owner. Mi-do is a troubled young woman who is full of drive and ambition; she is determined to better her life to forget the hardships of her poverty-stricken childhood. In Mi-do, Tae-sang sees so much of his own personality that he is drawn to her fire and passion. As he begins to fall in love with her, he realizes that he will do anything to protect her and try to give her a better life, perhaps to redeem himself. As the plot proceeds Mi-do meets Lee Jae-hee (Yeon Woo-jin) who falls in love with her. The story later on how Han Tae-sang,  Seo Mi-do & Lee Jae-hee deal with their mutual love and relation.

Cast

Main characters
Song Seung-heon - Han Tae-sang         
Tae-sang is a thug, a cold-hearted loan shark who survives his boss's betrayal and steps up from right-hand man to head of the gang. Then he falls in love for the first time, and leaves it all behind in the name of love, morphing into a successful businessman.

Shin Se-kyung - Seo Mi-do  
A hardworking young woman who comes from a poor family.

Chae Jung-an - Baek Seung-joo 
The ex-girlfriend of Tae-sang's old mob boss, who is in love with Tae-sang.

Yeon Woo-jin - Lee Jae-hee 
A confident young man who's used to winning at everything. Tae-sang supported him through post secondary education but his friendship with Tae-sang turns to rivalry when both are in love with Mi-do.

Supporting characters
Jay B - Seo Mi-joon 
Mi-do's younger brother, a trainee with a major talent agency.
Park Jin-young - Ddol-yi
A part-time employee who works for Tae-sang's mother.
Kang Shin-il - Seo Kyung-wook
Oh Young-shil - Choi Seon-ae
Lee Chang-hoon - Gu Yong-gab
Kim Sung-oh - Lee Chang-hee 
Jo Jae-ryong - Yoon Dong-gu
Jung Young-sook - Yoon Hong-ja là mẹ của chủ tịch han
Park Min-ji - Eun-ae
Lee Min-ji - Jin Song-yeon
Lee Sung-min - Kim Dae-kwang, Tae-sang's boss (guest appearance, ep 1-2,4)

Ratings
In the table below,  represent the lowest ratings and  represent the highest ratings.

References

External links
  
 When a Man Falls in Love at MBC Global Media
 
 

2013 South Korean television series debuts
2013 South Korean television series endings
MBC TV television dramas
Korean-language television shows
South Korean romance television series
South Korean melodrama television series
Television series by IWill Media